Campo Verde is a municipality in the state of Mato Grosso in the Central-West Region of Brazil.

The municipality contains 13% of the  Rio da Casca Ecological Station, a strictly protected conservation unit created in 1994.

See also
List of municipalities in Mato Grosso

References

Municipalities in Mato Grosso